John Laliberte (born August 5, 1983) is an American former professional ice hockey Winger. He most notably played for EHC Wolfsburg and ERC Ingolstadt in the Deutsche Eishockey Liga (DEL). He was selected by the Vancouver Canucks in the 4th round (114th overall) of the 2002 NHL Entry Draft.

Playing career
Laliberte played collegiate hockey for the Boston University Terriers of the Hockey East.

Unsigned from the Canucks, Laliberte played in the American Hockey League with the Worcester Sharks and Milwaukee Admirals before pursuing a European career. After a season in Denmark playing for the Odense Bulldogs of the then AL-Bank Ligaen, Laliberte transferred to the German DEL, signing with the Grizzly Adams Wolfsburg.

After three seasons with the Grizzlys, Laliberte signed a contract with fellow German club, ERC Ingolstadt on May 18, 2012. During the 2013–14 season, on December 14, 2013, Laliberte was signed to a three-year contract extension to remain in Ingolstadt.

Laliberte, who agreed on another one-year-contract in Ingolstadt until 2018, has been named twice as captain of the team.
Due to his constance in scoring, Laliberte has become one of the topscorers of ERC Ingolstadt's history.

At the conclusion of the 2017–18 season, Laliberte opted to end his contract early and announce his retirement from professional hockey after 12 seasons.

Personal
Laliberte and his wife, Candice, have two children. He lives in Portland, Maine and accepted a new career in a property development post playing career.

Career statistics

References

External links

1983 births
Living people
American men's ice hockey left wingers
Augusta Lynx players
Boston University Terriers men's ice hockey players
ERC Ingolstadt players
Ice hockey people from Maine
People from Saco, Maine
Milwaukee Admirals players
Odense Bulldogs players
Trenton Devils players
Vancouver Canucks draft picks
Grizzlys Wolfsburg players
Worcester Sharks players